Mahon Bridge, also spelled Mahonbridge, is a village in the parish of Kilrossanty in mid County Waterford, Ireland, located on the R676 road between Carrick on Suir and Dungarvan. The nearest town is Kilmacthomas.

Amenities
The village has a local shop, a garage and crash repair yard, and a historic creamery which is no longer in use.

Toponymy
Mahon Bridge is named for the bridge which crosses the River Mahon at this point, the river running from the Mahon Falls in the Comeragh Mountains to the sea at Bunmahon. Mahon Bridge is well known to walkers and hill climbers who use the village as a jumping-off point for visits to the Falls.

Buildings
In 2009 a hydroelectric power station was completed just upriver from Mahon Bridge. The station is privately owned and is fed from two weirs, one on the Mahon and the other on the Mahon Og, about 2 km upstream of the village. The scheme generates a maximum of 850 kW of electricity to add to the national grid. The turbine house is of a very inconspicuous and low profile design being mostly located below ground level and not visible from the nearby road.  The turbine house is located very close to a large ruined mill which was built in the famine years 1845–1848 but which saw little use as a corn mill before being sold. At some stage in the mid 20th century part of it was demolished by Waterford Co. Council and the stone used for road building.

Sport
Stage 2 of the 1998 Tour de France passed through Mahon Bridge.

Location
The village is laid out around a triangular field, from which roads lead to Kilrossanty, Fews, Furraleigh, Briska and Lyre.

Archaeology
Archaeological sites 500 meters west of the village:
 A castle owned by Darby O'Brien in 1641 and it was described as a large slate house with a bawn. It is said to have been occupied by a Peter Anthony in 1643 when it was burnt by a party of Royalists under Sir Charles Vavasour. Located in a private garden at the base of Crough Hill. It is not visible at ground level.
 An ogham stone originally from the Knockalafalla-Rathgormuck area is now kept at Comeragh Lodge.
 A Children's Burial Ground marked only on the 1926 ed. of the OS 6-inch map.
 A souterrain South West of the Children's Burial Ground. An area of ground collapse in 2002 led to a stone-lined cavity, which could not be entered but which could be a beehive chamber of a souterrain.

See also
 List of towns and villages in Ireland

References

Towns and villages in County Waterford